Alpha Sculptoris, Latinized from α Sculptoris, is the Bayer designation for a blue-white star in the southern constellation of Sculptor. It has an apparent visual magnitude of +4.30, which makes it the brightest star in this generally faint constellation.

Alpha Sculptoris is a B-type giant star. It is classified as an SX Arietis type variable star and its magnitude varies by less than a tenth of a magnitude.

The luminosity of α Scl is around 1,500 times that of the Sun while its surface temperature is 13,600 K. The radius of Alpha Sculptoris is calculated to be seven times solar while its mass is five times that of the Sun.

References

Sculptoris, Alpha
Sculptor (constellation)
B-type giants
SX Arietis variables
0280
005737
004577
CD-30 00297
Ap stars